Vičanci is a settlement in the Slovene Hills northwest of Ormož in northeastern Slovenia. The area belongs to the traditional region of Styria. It is now included in the Drava Statistical Region.

There is a small roadside chapel with a belfry in the northern part of the settlement. It was built in the early 20th century.

References

External links 
 Vičanci on Geopedia

Populated places in the Municipality of Ormož